Antikiller is a 2002 Russian crime film directed by Egor Konchalovsky. It portrays a brutal war between obnoxious crime gangs and a one-man vigilante, a former police officer. The movie is based on Danil Koretsky’s novel of the same name, which has sold five million copies in the countries of the former Soviet Union and has acquired cult status among readers of Russian pulp fiction. Like the novel, the film became the box office leader among Russian films in 2002.

Plot
Former criminal investigator, Major Korenev, nicknamed Fox, gets out of jail, where he spent many years after being betrayed by his corrupt colleagues, and settles scores with his old and new enemies.

The film uncovers the anatomy of the beginning of Russian economical boom which began the in 1990s and the many varieties of crime which came with it. Fox (Gosha Kutsenko)  went to jail when the Soviet Union was still alive, but returns from prison to a new country, Russia, which the film portrays as a lawless post-industrial wasteland ruled by competing criminal gangs. Fox settles accounts with Shaman (Aleksandr Baluev), the criminal boss who sent him to jail; kills Ape (Viktor Sukhorukov), a sadistic gang leader who kills and rapes randomly for art's sake; topples the city's major gangs; and reestablishes his version of the rule of law. The only criminal boss who survives the war among the major gangs is "Cross" (Sergei Shakurov), whose ascetic and down to earth style helps him to unseat the kingpin "Father" (Mikhail Ulyanov) modeled on Don Vito Corleone.

Cast
 Gosha Kutsenko as Major Korenev, aka Fox.
 Mikhail Ulyanov as Father
 Sergey Shakurov as Cross
 Aleksandr Belyavskiy as King
 Ivan Bortnik as Bedbug
 Valentin Golubenko as Gangreen
 Aleksandr Baluev as Shaman
 Yevgeni Sidikhin as Barcass
 Viktor Sukhorukov as Ambal
 Mikhail Yefremov as Banker
 Viktoriya Tolstoganova as Tamara
 Vyacheslav Razbegaev as Metis
 Polina Sidikhina as daughter of mobster "Longboat"
 Yuriy Dumchev as Valet
 Vyacheslav Molokov as Bobovkin
 Sergey Veksler as Major Litvinov

External links
 

2002 films
2000s Russian-language films
Russian crime action films
Films based on Russian novels
Russian vigilante films
2000s crime action films
2000s vigilante films